Switzerland competed at the 1988 Winter Olympics in Calgary, Alberta, Canada.

Medalists

Competitors
The following is the list of number of competitors in the Games.

Alpine skiing

Men

Men's combined

Women

Women's combined

Bobsleigh

Cross-country skiing

Men

 C = Classical style, F = Freestyle

Men's 4 × 10 km relay

Women

 C = Classical style, F = Freestyle

Women's 4 × 5 km relay

Figure skating

Men

Women

Ice hockey

Group A
Top three teams (shaded ones) entered the medal round.

Switzerland 2-1 Finland
Canada 4-2 Switzerland
Sweden 4-2 Switzerland
Switzerland 4-1 Poland
Switzerland 9-0 France

Game for 7th place

|}

Team Roster
Jakob Kölliker
Patrice Brasey
André Künzi
Manuele Celio
Thomas Vrabec
Jörg Eberle
Peter Jaks
Fredy Lüthi
Gil Montandon
Fausto Mazzoleni
Andreas Ritsch
Bruno Rogger
Philipp Neuenschwander
Gaëtan Boucher
Felix Hollenstein
Roman Wäger
Markus Leuenberger
Peter Schlagenhauf
Urs Burkart
Pietro Cunti
Olivier Anken
Richard Bucher

Nordic combined 

Men's individual

Events:
 normal hill ski jumping 
 15 km cross-country skiing 

Men's Team

Three participants per team.

Events:
 normal hill ski jumping 
 10 km cross-country skiing

Ski jumping 

Men's team large hill

 1 Four teams members performed two jumps each. The best three were counted.

References

Official Olympic Reports
International Olympic Committee results database
 Olympic Winter Games 1988, full results by sports-reference.com

Nations at the 1988 Winter Olympics
1988
Olympics